Utica Armory is a historic National Guard armory building located in Utica in Oneida County, New York. It is a structural steel structure with brick curtain walls built in 1930 for Troop A, 121st Cavalry, and designed by State architect William Haugaard.

It consists of a two-story administration building with an attached three story drill shed. The administrative building features Tudor inspired towers, turrets and crenelated parapets.

It was listed on the National Register of Historic Places in 1995.

References

Buildings and structures in Utica, New York
Armories on the National Register of Historic Places in New York (state)
Infrastructure completed in 1930
National Register of Historic Places in Oneida County, New York